This is a list of commercial banks in Botswana

 Absa Bank Botswana
 Access Bank Botswana
 Bank Gaborone Limited
 Bank of Baroda (Botswana) Limited
 First Capital Bank Limited
 First National Bank of Botswana Limited
 Stanbic Bank Botswana Limited
 Standard Chartered Bank Botswana Limited

External links
 Directory of Financial Institutions As At December 2020

See also
 List of banks in Africa
 Economy of Botswana

References

 
Banks
Botswana
Botswana